The 2011 Slovak Open was a professional tennis tournament played on indoor hard courts. It was the twelfth and sixth edition of the tournament which was part of the Tretorn SERIE+ of the  2011 ATP Challenger Tour and the 2011 ITF Women's Circuit. It took place in Bratislava, Slovakia between 14 and 20 November 2011.

ATP entrants

Seeds

 1 Rankings are as of 7 November 2011.

Other entrants
The following players received wildcards into the singles main draw:
  Filip Horanský
  Jozef Kovalík
  Andrej Martin
  Jiří Veselý

The following players received entry as a special exempt into the singles main draw:
  Jan Hernych
  Peter Torebko

The following players received entry from the qualifying draw:
  Kamil Čapkovič
  Jan Minář
  Boris Pašanski
  Ante Pavić

WTA entrants

Seeds

 1 Rankings are as of 7 November 2011.

Other entrants
The following players received wildcards into the singles main draw:
  Lucia Butkovská
  Barbora Krejčíková
  Paulína Petrisková
  Anna Karolína Schmiedlová

The following players received entry from the qualifying draw:
  Daria Gavrilova
  Richèl Hogenkamp
  Michaela Hončová
  Lyudmyla Kichenok
  Nadiia Kichenok
  Zuzana Luknárová
  Nicole Rottmann
  Andreea Văideanu

The following players received entry from a Special Exempt spot:
  Paula Kania
  Ana Vrljić

Champions

Men's singles

 Lukáš Lacko def.  Ričardas Berankis, 7–6(9–7), 6–2

Women's singles

 Lesia Tsurenko def.  Karolína Plíšková, 7–5, 6–3

Men's doubles

 Jan Hájek /  Lukáš Lacko def.  Lukáš Rosol /  David Škoch, 7–5, 7–5

Women's doubles

 Naomi Broady /  Kristina Mladenovic def.  Karolína Plíšková /  Kristýna Plíšková, 5–7, 6–4, [10–2]

External links
 Official website
 Women's ITF Search 
 Men's ITF Search

Slovak Open
Slovak Open
Slovak Open
Slovak Open
Slovak Open